Robert Poole may refer to:

 Robert Poole (historian) (born 1957), professor of history at the University of Central Lancashire
 Robert Poole (politician) (born 1948), Australian politician
 Robert Poole (rugby league), English rugby league player
 Robert W. Poole, Jr., founder of the Reason Foundation

See also
 Robert Roy Pool (born 1953), American screenwriter
 Robert Pooley (disambiguation)